Soifer is a surname. Notable people with the surname include:

Alexander Soifer (born 1948), Russian-born American mathematician and mathematics author
Aviam Soifer (born 1948), American legal scholar and academic administrator

See also
Sofer (disambiguation)